Catches and Glees is the first album by folk duo Hannah James and Sam Sweeney.

Track listing

Personnel

 Hannah James (piano accordion, vocals, clogs)
 Sam Sweeney (fiddle, viola, nyckelharpa)

2009 debut albums
Hannah James and Sam Sweeney albums
Folk albums